The 2002 United States Shadow Senator election in the District of Columbia took place on November 5, 2002, to elect a shadow member to the United States Senate to represent the District of Columbia. The member was only recognized by the District of Columbia and was not officially sworn or seated by the United States Senate. Incumbent Shadow Senator Paul Strauss decisively won the primary against challenger Pete Ross and was reelected to a second term by a landslide.

Primary elections 
Party primaries took place on September 10, 2002.

Democratic primary

Candidates 
 Paul Strauss, incumbent shadow senator
 Pete Ross, businessman, landlord, former Army captain

Results

Republican primary

Candidates 
 Norma M. Sasaki
 Clark D. Horvath

General election 
Strauss faced Republican Norma M. Sasaki, and D.C. Statehood Green candidate Joyce Robinson-Paul. As is usual for Democrats in the District, Strauss won in a landslide.

Candidates 
 Paul Strauss (Democratic)
 Norma M. Sasaki (Republican)
 Joyce Robinson-Paul (D.C. Statehood Green)

Results

References 

2002 elections in Washington, D.C.
Washington, D.C., Shadow Senator elections